San Francisco Fire Department Engine Co. Number 2, at 460 Bush St. in San Francisco, California, was built in 1908.  It was listed on the National Register of Historic Places in 2002.

It was designed by city architect Newton J. Tharp in Beaux Arts style. It is a two-story three-bay building with a projecting entablature and a raised parapet, clad with warm gray stone.

References

External links

Beaux-Arts architecture in California
Fire stations completed in 1908
Fire stations on the National Register of Historic Places in California
National Register of Historic Places in San Francisco